Robert Edward Knievel II (May 7, 1962 – January 13, 2023) was an American motorcyclist and stunt performer. He had also used the stage name Kaptain Robbie Knievel.

Early life 

Robbie Knievel was born on May 7, 1962, the son of stuntman Robert "Evel" Knievel and his first wife, Linda. He was the second of four children. Knievel began jumping his bicycle when he was four years old and learnt how to ride motorcycles by the age of seven. He performed his first show with his father at Madison Square Garden when he was eight. On tour with his father when he was twelve, he would perform in the pre-jump shows. Knievel attended Central Catholic High School in Butte, Montana between 1975 and 1976, but never graduated. He wanted to lengthen his jumps, but his father disapproved. Knievel then went solo after his father's approval.

Comparisons with Evel Knievel 
Knievel's jumping career was markedly different from his father's. Most notably, Knievel used Honda CR500 motocross bikes, whereas his father made most of his record-breaking jumps using a Harley-Davidson XR-750 motorcycle. The XR-750 is 90 pounds heavier and the Honda is a motocross bike whereas the Harley is a flat-track racing motorcycle. Robbie made and often replicated Evel's jumps, including Evel's 1967 Caesars Palace crash, except for two of his father's major accomplishments — a Harley-Davidson XR-750 jump and the Snake River Canyon jump using the Skycycle X-2. Although never attempted, Robbie stated that he wanted to use a Harley to clear a record-breaking 16 buses, three more buses than his father attempted at Wembley Stadium in 1975. Additionally, Robbie stated that he would attempt to re-create his father's 1974 failed rocket jump over the Snake River Canyon near Twin Falls, Idaho.

Leather jumpsuits 
Knievel used red-white-and-blue V-shaped jumpsuits, similar to his father's famous white leather jumpsuit. Throughout his career, Knievel had three notable jumpsuit styles:  
A white jumpsuit with a red V lined with white stars used as a teenager touring with his father
A white jumpsuit with a blue V lined with white stars and a removable cape used throughout his professional career
A black jumpsuit with a white V lined with blue stars used in 2009 for the Las Vegas Mirage jump and promotional photos for the possible XR-750 Wembley jump.
A second black jumpsuit with a white V lined with red stars was used in promotional photographs in 2010 and 2011 but not used in a jump.

Daredevil jumps 
Robbie completed over 340 jumps, setting 20 world records.

Televised jumps 
Several of Knievel's jumps were televised live, including the Caesars Palace jump, the building-to-building jump in Las Vegas, a jump over a moving train, a jump in front of the volcano at The Mirage hotel in Las Vegas, Nevada, and the Grand Canyon jump.

Performance jumps 
In 1996, Knievel jumped over ten limousines on the Las Vegas Strip, achieving a 230-foot motorbike leap record.

In 2003, Knievel jumped 15 trucks at the Chinook Winds Casino. In late March 2006, Knievel jumped 180 feet over the St. Johns River from one barge to another in Jacksonville, Florida. In late July 2006, he made a tribute jump to his father Evel at Evel Knievel Day in Butte, Montana by jumping over a pyrotechnic show.

On March 18, 2007, Knievel jumped an assortment of military vehicles at the North Carolina Auto Expo in Raleigh, North Carolina. Soon afterward, he appeared in a nationally-broadcast commercial for Holiday Inn Express. On June 9, 2007, he appeared in Wilmington, Delaware, and successfully made a 150-foot jump over fake money representing the amount of interest paid to the customers of ING Direct. In August 2007, he was inducted into the Motorcycle Hall of Fame in Sturgis, South Dakota, and made a jump at the Buffalo Chip campground.

Knievel successfully jumped over 24 truck cabs at the Kings Island Amusement Park outside Cincinnati, Ohio, on May 24, 2008. The jump took place 33 years after his father made daredevil history by jumping over 14 Greyhound buses on a Harley-Davidson XR-750 at Kings Island.

Knievel successfully jumped on June 7, 2008, at the Texas Motor Speedway in Fort Worth, Texas. He cleared 21 Hummers on the front stretch of the speedway. He originally was going to jump 25 Hummers, but there was a strong sustained headwind that evening.

While performing pre-jump wheelies at the LCO Casino near Hayward, Wisconsin, on August 16, 2008, Knievel fell off the bike and slid into some hay bales, dislocating his shoulder. Despite his injury, he performed the jump, clearing four small airplanes and a small helicopter.

On October 31, 2008, Knievel successfully performed two back-to-back jumps in Nashville, Tennessee, to promote a glow-in-the-dark paint. Knievel ended 2008 with a New Year's Eve jump at the newly-renovated volcano at The Mirage in Las Vegas. The stunt was advertised as a jump over the top of the Mirage's volcano; however, Knievel limited the stunt to an approximately  ramp-to-ramp jump in front of the volcano. Knievel claimed the false promotion of a jump over the volcano was decided by the Mirage Hotel, which did not want to tear down some palm trees or have its valet parking affected. The live Fox television special marked the eighth live special in Knievel's career.

Knievel's last jump was held on October 29, 2011, in Coachella, California, at the Spotlight 29 Casino. Knievel jumped  over semi-trailer trucks.

Television
In mid-2005, Knievel starred in the A&E TV series Knievel's Wild Ride. Knievel also made appearances on CHiPs and Hawaii Five-O and co-starred with Lee Majors in a pilot for a series to be called Hollywood Stunts. Knievel was the subject of a 2017 documentary, Chasing Evel: The Robbie Knievel Story.

Business ventures 
In 2006, Knievel opened a new business called Knievel's Custom Cycles, based in Lake Hopatcong, New Jersey.

Personal life and death 
Knievel had three daughters, Krysten, Karmen, and Maria. He also had two grandchildren, Analise and Kane. He died from pancreatic cancer in Reno, Nevada, on January 13, 2023, at age 60.

References

External links
 
21 Hummer Jump at Texas Motor Speedway
 

1962 births
2023 deaths
People from Butte, Montana
American stunt performers
Motorcycle stunt performers
World record setters in motorcycling
Deaths from cancer in Nevada
Deaths from pancreatic cancer